Dream No. 7 is the second studio album by the German band Reamonn. It was recorded in 2001 and released on 19 November 2001.

The album title comes from the number of the band's former home and rehearsal room in Munzingen, a suburb of Freiburg.

With the single "Weep", Reamonn had a guest appearance in the German film .

Track listing

Charts

Weekly charts

Year-end charts

References 

2001 albums
Reamonn albums